Aminath Rasheedha (born 27 February 1967) is a Maldivian actress and director.

Career

1993–2006: Early releases and directorial debut
In 1995, Rasheedha appeared in Mohamed Shiyaz's Dhushman which features Hussain Sobah, Mariyam Nisha and Hamid Ali in pivotal roles. In the film, she plays the role Seema, a sympathetic doctor who falls in love with a blind man. Rasheedha made a brief appearance in Yoosuf Rafeeu's award-winning film Haqqu (1996) as Madheeha, a friend of Areesha who suffers from an unhappy marriage. The film starring Mariyam Nisha, Reeko Moosa Manik and Mariyam Shakeela in lead roles, received positive reviews from critics.

She starred in Mohamed Ali Manik's Maazee (2000) which narrates the story of two best friends, a boy and a girl, who get separated at childhood and reunite as adults. Rasheedha played the role of Zubeydha, the impecunious mother who sends her daughter to Male' seeking a prosperous future only to be dejected by her daughter as an adult. In 1998, she played the helpless mother of Mary, a devoted wife desperately seeking affection from her husband in Abdul Faththaah's television drama series Dhoapatta (2000). Starring alongside Mohamed Shavin, Sheela Najeeb and Jamsheedha Ahmed, the series centers on unrequited love and complications of a relationship within and beyond marriage. Her collaboration with Faththaah was repeated the same year with another romantic drama series, Aisha where she played the infertile widow handling a guest-house business. Mariyam Shauqee's widely acclaimed family drama television series Kahthiri was released during the same year, where he played the role of the dependable sister-in-law, living in a congested housing complex while dealing with several social issues.

This was followed by the Ali Musthafa-directed Umurah (1999) opposite Jamsheedha Ahmed and Reeko Moosa Manik. In the next year she played the role of Shaheedha, a loyal wife who looks past her husband's affairs with other women in Abdul Faththaah's directorial debut, Himeyn Dhuniye which received positive reviews from critics. Also, she starred as a workaholic mother in Hussain Shihab's Rihun and as a caring aunt in the Abdulla Sujau and Abdul Faththaah-directed family drama Ranmuiy which is centered on the dispute between a daughter and her step-mother.

Rasheedha collaborated with Amjad Ibrahim for his romantic horror film Dhonkamana (2003) which depicts the romantic relationship between a young man (played by Yoosuf Shafeeu) and an old woman (played by Fauziyya Hassan). Featuring Hassan, Yoosuf Shafeeu, Sheela Najeeb, Niuma Mohamed, Sheereen Abdul Wahid and Amira Ismail, the film received mainly negative reviews from critics though its inclusion of the theme portraying the relationship between a couple with a large age group was appraised. Her most successful release of the year was Fathimath Nahula's romantic film Kalaayaanulaa (2003) which follows a happily married couple (played by Yoosuf Shafeeu and Aishath Shiranee) where the husband decided to marry his childhood best friend (played by Niuma Mohamed) when his wife fails to sexually please him. The film received widespread critical acclaim for its performances and was declared to be year's highest grossing Maldivian film release. It was followed by Abdul Faththaah-directed Aan... Aharenves Loabivin (2002) starred alongside Ali Seezan, Niuma Mohamed, Sheela Najeeb and Neena Saleem where she played the mother of her only child who had a bitter relationship with her lovers and an unfortunate incidence leading her to suffer from amnesia. Upon release, the film opened to positive response from critics and was a commercially successful project. She was applauded for her performance as the unjust mother-in-law, in the Abdul Faththaah-directed critically acclaimed television series, Thiyey Mihithuge Vindhakee (2003) which was considered one of the best series production in television industry.

Rasheedha next starred as the mother of a heartbroken fangirl in Amjad Ibrahim's next directorial venture Sandhuravirey 2 (2004); a sequel to his 2002 horror film Sandhuravirey which presented Yoosuf Shafeeu and Mariyam Nisha in lead roles. Starring additional cast including Zeenath Abbas, Mohamed Shavin and Sheereen Abdul Wahid, the film follows a storyline of a daughter jinn avenging the death of its mother and sister on Dhiyash's family. Similar to its prequel, the film received negative response from critics.

Rasheedha received appreciation for her "authentic" performance as the benign mother of her loyal and depressive daughter-in-law in Abdul Faththaah's critically praised romantic film Vehey Vaarey Therein (2003). Featuring Yoosuf Shafeeu, Jamsheedha Ahmed, Khadheeja Ibrahim Didi, Mohamed Shavin and Amira Ismail in crucial roles, the film narrates the story of unrequited love, and proved to be one of the highest-grossing Maldivian films of the year. She then stepped into Fathimath Nahula's critically and commercially successful romantic drama television series, Kalaage Haqqugaa to portray the role of Waheedha, a demanding mother who is ready to go extreme extent to keep her family intact. She rose to widespread prominence in the television industry with her performance as a religious and protective mother in the Arifa Ibrahim-directed critically acclaimed television series, Vairoalhi Ahves Sirrun (2005) which revolves around two best-friends involved in extra-marital affairs and who fail to practice their duty as husband and wife. Starring alongside Niuma Mohamed, Ahmed Asim, Lufshan Shakeeb and Mariyam Shakeela, the series was listed as one of the most successful television series.

Rasheedha starred, produced and co-directed Yaaraa's debut production, a romantic horror film Hukuru Vileyrey alongside Aishath Rishmy which was based on a novel published by Ibrahim Waheed on Haveeru Daily in 2003. The film was a critical and commercial success while being considered "one of the few acceptable horror film the Maldivian Film Industry has ever produced". It was later released as 15 episodes television series with inclusion of several clips that were edited off while released in theatre. The same year, she again collaborated with the team of Vairoalhi Ahves Sirrun for Arifa Ibrahim's another romantic television drama series, Vaguthu Faaithu Nuvanees (2006) which consists of fifty episodes. The series which follows the vengeance and retribution two best-friends go through when they both love the same person, features Rasheedha in a villainous role as a voracious and intemperate wife. Her performance received positive reviews from critics and was awarded as the Best Villain at the 2nd Miadhu Crystal Award ceremony.

2010–present:Niuma and professional expansion
Rasheedha's first release of 2010 was Abdul Faththaah's horror film Jinni alongside Ali Seezan and Mariyam Afeefa. Based on true incidents that occurred in an island of Maldives, she played the mother of Javid who has been enthralled by a ghost. Prior to release the film was marketed to be full of "suspense and uniqueness" compared to other mediocre Maldivian horror films. Upon release, the film received mixed reviews from critics; majority of them complaining for having the "same old feeling" of prior horror flicks though the performance were noted to be satisfactory. Despite the mixed reviews, the film witnessed a positive response at the box office, screening a total of twenty two housefull shows in Male', declaring it as a Mega-Hit. She next starred alongside Aishath Rishmy and Ahmed Azmeel in Rishmy's drama film Fanaa (2010), which was produced by Rasheedha. Based on a novel published by Ibrahim Waheed titled Balgish, she played the role of an austere mother. Upon release, the film received mixed to negative reviews from critics; Ali Naafiz from Haveeru Daily classified the film as the "worst Maldivian film released so far" during the year, criticising the performance of actors. However, other critics found the performance of Rasheedha to be on a "standing ovation" level, though displeased with the length of the film. At the 6th Gaumee Film Awards, she was bestowed with Best Costume Designer award while she was nominated as the Best Actress for her performance in the film.

She next starred in Niuma Mohamed's directorial debut drama film Niuma (2010) alongside an ensemble cast including Mohamed, Yoosuf Shafeeu, Sheela Najeeb, Mohamed Manik and Abdulla Muaz. She played the helpless mother of a daughter who has been sexually abused by her father and brother. She considered the role to be the most satisfying performance she has delivered so far. Upon release, the film met with widespread critical acclaim specifically complimenting the performance of actors and its dialogues. Being able to screen over thirty housefull shows of the film, it was declared a Mega-Hit at box office, and the highest grossing Maldivian release of the year. The film fetched her a Best Supporting Actress nomination at both, Enchanteur Maldives Film Awards 2012 and 6th Gaumee Film Awards ceremony. The last release of the year featured Rasheedha in Yoosuf Shafeeu's drama film Heyonuvaane (2010). The story revolves around a male who is victimised of domestic abuse. She played a heart patient and a mother of Ziyad, an impotent husband who has been discriminated and abused by her ferocious wife. The film received majorly negative reviews from critics, though her performance was commended. Twenty two housefull shows of the film were screened at cinema, declaring it a Mega-Hit and second highest grossing Maldivian release of the year.

The following year, Rasheedha first appeared in Aishath Ali Manik's romantic horror film Kuhveriakee Kaakuhey? (2011) opposite Ahmed Azmeel and Aishath Rishmy. Inspired by the horror romantic thriller Bollywood film Darling (2007), pre-production of the film was started in 2007 and shot in Sri Lanka. It revolves around a man who cheats on his wife with his secretary, and how his life slides to a haunting shift when he accidentally kills his mistress. The film received negative reviews from critics, while her performance was noted to be "acceptable". The film did little business at boxoffice and was declared a flop. Her next release was Ahmed Azmeel's debut direction Hiyy Yaara Dheefa (2011), starred alongside Ali Seezan, Niuma Mohamed, Ahmed Azmeel and Aishath Rishmy. The film received negative reviews from critics pointing similarities between Bollywood comedy-drama film Ishq (1997) and Kundan Shah's family drama Dil Hai Tumhaara (2002). The film revolves around four young people from different social classes fall in love with partners who do not meet with their parents' approval. She played Nahidha, a rich counselor who complicates the love life of her daughters. The film did not succeed financially, but her portrayal was moderately acclaimed by critics.

Rasheedha's first release of 2019 was the Moomin Fuad-directed psychological horror thriller Nivairoalhi (2019) which marks Niuma Mohamed's last onscreen film. Revolving around a patient suffering from depression, she played the mother of Riffath, the young husband helping his wife to overcome mood disorder. 
Starring opposite Mohamed, Yoosuf Shafeeu and Ahmed Asim, the film received majorly positive reviews from critics; Aishath Maaha of Dho? favored the performance of the lead actors and mentioned the "neat arrangement" of its screenplay though pointed out its "weak ending" to be unsatisfactory while her performance was noted to be "great as usual".

Filmography

Feature film

Television

Short film

Accolades

References 

1967 births
Living people
People from Malé
21st-century Maldivian actresses
Maldivian film actresses
Maldivian film directors
Maldivian women film directors